Jevgeņijs Borodavko (born 4 November 1986) is a Latvian judoka.

Born in Riga. By finishing 7th at the 2007 European Championships, he qualified for the 2008 Summer Olympics, losing to Roberto Meloni in the first round of the middleweight (-90 kg) competition.

He also qualified for the 2012 Summer Olympics, having moved to the half-heavyweight (-100 kg) division.  There he beat Anthony Liu of American Samoa before losing to Dimitri Peters.

Achievements

References

External links
 
 
 

1986 births
Living people
Latvian male judoka
Judoka at the 2008 Summer Olympics
Judoka at the 2012 Summer Olympics
Judoka at the 2016 Summer Olympics
Olympic judoka of Latvia
Sportspeople from Riga
European Games competitors for Latvia
Judoka at the 2015 European Games
Judoka at the 2019 European Games
20th-century Latvian people
21st-century Latvian people